Desmiphora cirrosa is a species of beetle in the family Cerambycidae. It was described by Wilhelm Ferdinand Erichson in 1847. It is known from Argentina, Brazil, Ecuador, French Guiana, Mexico, Panama, and Peru.

References

Desmiphora
Beetles described in 1847